Betta hipposideros is a species of gourami native to Malaysia ; its range extends southwards to the Riau Archipelago. It is an inhabitant of blackwater swamps.

References

hipposideros
Freshwater fish of Malaysia
Freshwater fish of Sumatra
Taxa named by Ng Peter Kee Lin
Taxa named by Maurice Kottelat
Fish described in 1994
Taxonomy articles created by Polbot